Juan Leandro Vogliotti (born April 11, 1985) is an Argentinian footballer who plays as a striker for Guabirá in Bolivian Primera División.

External links
 
 

1985 births
Living people
Argentine people of Italian descent
Argentine footballers
Argentine expatriate footballers
Association football forwards
Sportivo Belgrano footballers
Club Atlético Independiente footballers
Club Cipolletti footballers
Victory Sports Club players
Sportivo y Biblioteca Atenas de Río Cuarto players
Gimnasia y Tiro footballers
Estudiantes de Río Cuarto footballers
Trinidad de San Juan players
Patriotas Boyacá footballers
Club Atlético Ciclón players
Sport Boys Warnes players
Monagas S.C. players
Jaguares de Córdoba footballers
Club Real Potosí players
Guabirá players
Bolivian Primera División players
Venezuelan Primera División players
Categoría Primera A players
Torneo Argentino A players
Torneo Argentino B players
Argentine expatriate sportspeople in Colombia
Argentine expatriate sportspeople in Bolivia
Argentine expatriate sportspeople in Venezuela
Expatriate footballers in Colombia
Expatriate footballers in Bolivia
Expatriate footballers in Venezuela
Argentine football managers
Club Real Potosí managers
People from Río Cuarto, Córdoba
Sportspeople from Córdoba Province, Argentina